Ongwediva Constituency is an electoral constituency in the Oshana Region of Namibia. It had 27,396 inhabitants and 22,061 registered voters . Its district capital is the town of Ongwediva.

Politics
In the 2010 regional elections, SWAPO's Vinia Abisai won the constituency with 7,565 votes. He defeated challengers Nelson Katenda of the Rally for Democracy and Progress (RDP, 686 votes) and Lukas Naingungo of the Congress of Democrats (CoD, 70 votes). The 2015 regional elections were won by Andreas Uutoni (SWAPO) with 6,249 votes, far ahead of Peter Mandeinge (RDP) with 418 votes.

Councillor Uutoni (SWAPO) was reelected in the 2020 regional election, albeit by a much smaller margin. He beat Michael Mwashindange of the Independent Patriots for Change (IPC), an opposition party formed in August 2020, by 4,914 votes to 2,025.

References

Constituencies of Oshana Region
Ongwediva
States and territories established in 1992
1992 establishments in Namibia